May River Iwam, often simply referred to as Iwam, is a language of East Sepik Province, Papua New Guinea.

It is spoken in Iyomempwi, Mowi, and Premai villages of Tunap/Hunstein Rural LLG in East Sepik Province, and other villages on the May River.

Phonology

Vowels

When adjacent to nasal consonants, vowels are nasalized; nasalization may also occur when adjacent to word boundaries.

Consonants

Phonotactics
Bilabial and velar consonants and  may be followed by  when initial.

Pronouns
May River Iwam pronouns:

{| 
!  !! sg !! du !! pl
|-
! 1
| ka/ani || kərər || kərəm
|-
! 2
| ki || kor || kom
|-
! 3m
| si
| rowspan="2" | sor 
| rowspan="2" | səm
|-
! 3f
| sa
|}

Noun classes
Like the Wogamus languages, May River Iwam has five noun classes:

{| 
! class !! semantic category !! prefix !! example
|-
! class 1
| male human referents || nu- (adult males); ru- (uninitiated or immature males) || yenkam nu-tman class.1-one‘one man’
|-
! class 2
| female human, children, or other animate referents || a(o)- || owi a-oisduck class.2-two‘two ducks’
|-
! class 3
| large objects || kwu- || ana kwu-(o)thand class.3-one‘a big hand’
|-
! class 4
| small objects || ha- || ana ha-(o)thand class.4-one‘a small hand’
|-
! class 5
| long objects || hwu- || ana hwu-(o)thand class.5-one‘a long hand’
|}

As shown by the example above for ana ‘hand’, a noun can take on different classes depending on the physical characteristics being emphasized.

Vocabulary
The following basic vocabulary words of Iwam are from Foley (2005) and Laycock (1968), as cited in the Trans-New Guinea database:

{| class="wikitable sortable"
! gloss !! Iwam
|-
! head
| mu
|-
! ear
| wun
|-
! eye
| nu
|-
! nose
| nomwos
|-
! tooth
| piknu
|-
! tongue
| kwane
|-
! leg
| wərku; wɨrku
|-
! louse
| ŋən; nɨn
|-
! dog
| nwa
|-
! pig
| hu
|-
! bird
| owit
|-
! egg
| yen
|-
! blood
| ni
|-
! bone
| keew; kew
|-
! skin
| pəw
|-
! breast
| muy
|-
! tree
| pae(kap); paykap
|-
! man
| kam; yen-kam
|-
! woman
| wik
|-
! sun
| pi
|-
! moon
| pwan
|-
! water
| op; o(p)
|-
! fire
| pay
|-
! stone
| siya
|-
! eat
| (n)ai; (nd)ai
|-
! one
| oe; ruk; su
|-
! two
| ŋwis
|}

Notes

External links 
 Materials on Sepic Iwam are included in the open access Arthur Capell collections (AC1) held by Paradisec.

References

Iwam languages
Languages of East Sepik Province